Abdul Kader Siddique is a Bangladeshi politician. He is popularly known under the title "Bangabir." He served as a Mukti Bahini member and organizer of the Bangladesh Liberation War. He fought with an estimated 17,000-strong guerrilla force in the Tangail region against the Pakistan Army. The army was called Kaderia Bahini (Kader's Army). At the end of the war, in1971, Siddique's forces entered Dhaka along with the Indian forces, signaling the end of the war. He was awarded Bir Uttom by the Government of Bangladesh. Since 1999, he has been serving as the leader of his newly formed party, the Krishak Sramik Janata League.

Career
During the Bangladesh Liberation war, he formed Kaderia Bahini to fight against the Pakistan military. The Kaderia Bahini, as it is said, had approximately 17 thousand personnel. He was loyal to Sheikh Mujibur Rahman.

After the Independence of Bangladesh, Siddique went back to his home town of Tangail where he enjoyed considerable patronage from the Awami League, the party of Prime Minister Mujibur Rahman.

After the assassination of Sheikh Mujibur Rahman in 1975, Siddiqui and his followers organised attacks on the authorities of Khondakar Mushtaque's government. Elements loyal to Siddiqui operated from bases in Assam province in India and were actively supported by India's Border Security Force. In the insurgency against the military government of Bangladesh 104 rebels were killed and more than 500 were injured. The insurgency lasted more than two years. He was tried by a military court on 2July 24 1978  ,and sentenced to 7 years in jail. He was accused of killing a major and a number of soldiers of Bangladesh Army after the Assassination of Sheikh Mujibur Rahman following the 15 August 1975 Bangladesh coup d'état. On 1December 6 ,1990, he returned to Bangladesh from self imposed exile in India.

Siddique was elected member of the parliament of Bangladesh from different constituencies of Tangail.

In 1996, Siddique was elected to Parliament as a Bangladesh Awami League candidate from Tangail-8. In 1999, Siddique quit Awami League. He then resigned from the parliament and formed his own party the Krishak Sramik Janata League. This triggered a by-election, which he lost to the Bangladesh Awami League candidate, Shawakat Momen Shahjahan. Siddique was elected to parliament from Tangail 8 in the 2001 Bangladesh General Election as a candidate of the Krishak Sramik Janata League. On October 17, 2006, his rally was attacked by Bangladesh Chhatra League activists, leaving 11 injured in Jamalpur District.

In 2017, Bangladesh High Court disqualified Siddique from contesting a by-election from Tangail-4 because he had defaulted on a loan. He tried to contest the 2018 Bangladesh General Election from Tangail-4 and Tangail-8 but his candidacy was rejected by the Bangladesh Election Commission. He, along with his party, joined the Jatiya Oikyafront to contest the election against the Bangladesh Awami League alliance. His daughter, Kuri Siddique, also applied for nomination from Tangail-8 in case his candidacy was rejected. The Election Commission rejected the appeal filed by Siddique, challenging the cancellation of his nomination on December 8.

Personal life
Siddique is married to Nasrin Siddique. His elder brother Abdul Latif Siddiqui is also an Awami League politician who served as the member of parliament and the minister of Posts, Telecommunications and Information Technology. Their other two younger brothers are Murad Siddiqui and Azad Siddiqui.

References

Living people
Mukti Bahini personnel
Recipients of the Bir Uttom
8th Jatiya Sangsad members
Awami League politicians
Place of birth missing (living people)
7th Jatiya Sangsad members
People from Tangail District
1947 births